Marek Matuszek (born 28 September 1972 in Bratislava) is a Slovak judoka.

Achievements

References
 
sports-reference

1972 births
Living people
Slovak male judoka
Judoka at the 1996 Summer Olympics
Judoka at the 2000 Summer Olympics
Olympic judoka of Slovakia
Sportspeople from Bratislava
Universiade medalists in judo
Universiade silver medalists for Slovakia